Khan Hasnain Aaqib is a renowned Urdu, Hindi, and English poet who has as many as 17 published books to his credit so far. He is primarily known for writing Ghazals and Nazm in Urdu, Hindi and Persian languages. He is the member of the Urdu and Persian language committee of Balbharti, Pune. His Persian poetry is largely acknowledged in Persian speaking regions as well. He is credited for coining the term PROPHIEM for the genre of poems denoting the praise and biographic account of the Islamic prophet Muhammad. He is also the one who coined the term REFLECTIVE TRANSLATION for the work of literary and academic translation from one's mother tongue into any other language which is not the mother tongue of the translator. He initiated the movement insisting upon this term to be categorized and called as REFLECTIVE TRANSLATION

Early life 
Being born in Akola, Hasnain Aaqib spent his childhood in the same city. He is the eldest one among his ten siblings including six sisters and four brothers. Hasnain's mother died very young when he was hardly seven years old leaving behind her four children. His father Mohammad Shahbaz Khan married again begetting another set of six children with his second wife. He belonged to a economically moderate family. His grandfather Mohammad Mirbaz Khan aka Baba Taj Mastan was a mystic. Hasnain's father Mohammad Shahbaz Khan bought him up in a very disciplined manner. Hasnain graduated and earned his B.Ed from Akola. During his schooling days, his family's economic condition had begun to deteriorate. This forced him and his younger brother Ali Raza to start working at an early age. Both the brothers began to pull the cart of the family and bear the burden of the younger siblings along with their father. It was during these days of hardship that he began to explore the various modes of expressing himself. He finally settled with writing poetry in English and Urdu.

Career
Hasnain Aaqib joined Taj K.G and English High School in Akola as a teacher immediately after completing his graduation.  After his marriage, he moved to Pusad and joined G.N.Azad Jr. College of Education as Lecturer in 1999 where he is still working in the same capacity.

References

Urdu-language poets from India

1971 births
Living people